The Tepalcatepec skink (Mesoscincus altamirani) is a species of lizard in the family Scincidae. The species is endemic to Mexico.

Etymology
The specific name, altamirani, is in honor of Federico Altamirano who collected the holotype.

Geographic range
M. altamirani is found in the Mexican states of Guerrero and Michoacán.

Habitat
The preferred natural habitat of M. altamirani is forest.

Reproduction
The mode of reproduction of M. altamirani is unknown.

References

Further reading
Dugès A (1891). "Eumeces altamirani, A. Dug.". La Naturaleza, Periodico Cientifico de la Sociedad Mexicana de Historia Natural, Segunda Serie [Second Series] 1: 485–486. (Eumeces altamirani, new species, pp. 485–486). (in Spanish).
Griffith H, Ngo A, Murphy RW (2000). "A cladistic evaluation of the cosmopolitan genus Eumeces Wiegmann (Reptilia, Squamata, Scincidae)". Russian Journal of Herpetology 7 (1): 1–16. (Mesoscincus altamirani, new combination).
Taylor EH (1936). "The Rediscovery of the Lizard Eumeces altamirani (Dugès) with Notes on Two Other Mexican Species of the Genus". Proceedings of the Biological Society of Washington 49: 55–58.

Mesoscincus
Reptiles described in 1891
Endemic reptiles of Mexico
Taxa named by Alfredo Dugès